The 1971–72 Toronto Maple Leafs season was Toronto's 55th season of operation in the National Hockey League (NHL). It was also the 40th anniversary season of the opening of Maple Leaf Gardens. The Maple Leafs finished fourth, and qualified for the playoffs, losing in the first round to the eventual Stanley Cup champion Boston Bruins.

Offseason
In June, team president Stafford Smythe and vice-president Harold Ballard were arrested for theft and fraud involving funds of Maple Leaf Gardens. They were charged jointly on the theft of $146,000 of funds and securities and Smythe was further charged for defrauding Maple Leaf Gardens of $249,000.

Regular season
On October 13, just after the start of the season, Smythe died of complications from a bleeding ulcer. The Leaf's home opener, scheduled for that night was postponed, only the second postponement in Maple Leaf Gardens history.

Final standings

Schedule and results

Playoffs

Player statistics

Regular season
Scoring

Goaltending

Playoffs
Scoring

Goaltending

Awards and records

Transactions
The Maple Leafs have been involved in the following transactions during the 1971-72 season.

Trades

Intra-League Draft

Expansion Draft

Reverse Draft

Free agents

Draft picks
Toronto's draft picks at the 1971 NHL Amateur Draft held at the Queen Elizabeth Hotel in Montreal, Quebec.

Farm teams

See also
 1971–72 NHL season

References

External links

Toronto Maple Leafs season, 1971-72
Toronto Maple Leafs seasons
Toronto